Richard Woitach (July 27, 1935 – October 3, 2020) was an American conductor, pianist, and composer. In 1959, after studying music at the Eastman School of Music, Woitach jointed the Metropolitan Opera in New York City and served as a staff conductor there until 1997. In 1981, he collaborated with Canadian operatic soprano Teresa Stratas to record The Unknown Kurt Weill, a landmark Nonesuch record that introduced unpublished songs of German composer Kurt Weill and for which Woitach received a Grammy nomination in 1982. Woitach also was a long time collaborator with Canadian heldentenor Jon Vickers, where Woitach accompanied Vickers on the piano in several recorded recitals in both Canada and New York City. Woitach was survived by his wife soprano Jeryl Metz, his children and grandchildren.

At the Metropolitan Opera he first led, on tour, John Dexter's production of "Les vêpres siciliennes" (with Cristina Deutekom, Cornell MacNeil, and Paul Plishka, 1974), then conducted in the House, "Madama Butterfly" (with Harry Theyard, 1974), "La Gioconda," "Tosca," "Le siège de Corinthe" (with Beverly Sills and Shirley Verrett, 1976), "Lucia di Lammermoor" (with Miss Sills), "Tosca" (Sylvia Sass's Met debut, 1977), "La traviata" (Maria Chiara's Met debut, 1977), "Cavalleria rusticana," "Pagliacci" (with Vickers, 1978), "Don Pasquale" (with Jon Garrison, 1979), "Hänsel und Gretel" (with Tatiana Troyanos, Judith Blegen, and Michael Devlin, 1981), "La bohème," "Fidelio," "Bluebeard's Castle" (with Devlin and Jessye Norman), "Eugene Onegin" (with Mirella Freni), "Così fan tutte," "Boris Godounov," "Die Zauberflöte," "Die Entführung aus dem Serail," and, finally, "Elektra" (1994).  Woitach also led a production of Argento's "Postcard from Morocco," at Wolf Trap, with Phyllis Treigle in the cast.

References

External links
 Richard Woitach biography at guildmusic.com

1936 births
2020 deaths
20th-century American composers
20th-century American conductors (music)
20th-century American male musicians
20th-century American pianists
20th-century classical composers
20th-century classical pianists
21st-century American composers
21st-century American conductors (music)
21st-century American male musicians
21st-century American pianists
21st-century classical composers
21st-century classical pianists
American classical composers
American classical pianists
American conductors (music)
American male classical composers
American male classical pianists
American male conductors (music)
Eastman School of Music alumni
People from Schoharie County, New York